Bridge in Buckingham Township is a historic stone arch bridge located at Wycombe in Buckingham Township, Bucks County, Pennsylvania.  It has a total of six spans, four are 20 feet long and two 12 feet long, and was constructed in 1905.  It is constructed of roughly squared stone.

It was listed on the National Register of Historic Places in 1988.

References 

Road bridges on the National Register of Historic Places in Pennsylvania
Bridges completed in 1905
Bridges in Bucks County, Pennsylvania
1905 establishments in Pennsylvania
National Register of Historic Places in Bucks County, Pennsylvania
Stone arch bridges in the United States